Quadratic programming (QP) is the process of solving certain mathematical optimization problems involving quadratic functions. Specifically, one seeks to optimize (minimize or maximize) a multivariate quadratic function subject to linear constraints on the variables. Quadratic programming is a type of nonlinear programming.

"Programming" in this context refers to a formal procedure for solving mathematical problems. This usage dates to the 1940s and is not specifically tied to the more recent notion of "computer programming." To avoid confusion, some practitioners prefer the term "optimization" — e.g., "quadratic optimization."

Problem formulation
The quadratic programming problem with  variables and  constraints can be formulated as follows.
Given:
 a real-valued, -dimensional vector ,
 an -dimensional real symmetric matrix ,
 an -dimensional real matrix , and
 an -dimensional real vector ,
the objective of quadratic programming is to find an -dimensional vector , that will

{| cellspacing="10"
|-
| minimize
| 
|-
| subject to
| 
|}

Least squares

As a special case when Q is symmetric positive-definite, the cost function reduces to least squares:
{| cellspacing="10"
|-
| minimize
| 
|-
| subject to
| 
|}
Conversely, any such constrained least squares program can be equivalently framed as a QP, even for generic non-square  matrix.

Generalizations

A related programming problem, quadratically constrained quadratic programming, can be posed by adding quadratic constraints on the variables.

Solution methods

For general problems a variety of methods are commonly used, including

interior point,
active set,
augmented Lagrangian,
conjugate gradient,
gradient projection,
extensions of the simplex algorithm.

Equality constraints

Quadratic programming is particularly simple when  is positive definite and there are only equality constraints; specifically, the solution process is linear. By using Lagrange multipliers and seeking the extremum of the Lagrangian, it may be readily shown that the solution to the equality constrained problem

is given by the linear system

where  is a set of Lagrange multipliers which come out of the solution alongside .

The easiest means of approaching this system is direct solution (for example, LU factorization), which for small problems is very practical. For large problems, the system poses some unusual difficulties, most notably that the problem is never positive definite (even if  is), making it potentially very difficult to find a good numeric approach, and there are many approaches to choose from dependent on the problem.

If the constraints don't couple the variables too tightly, a relatively simple attack is to change the variables so that constraints are unconditionally satisfied. For example, suppose  (generalizing to nonzero is straightforward). Looking at the constraint equations:

introduce a new variable  defined by

where  has dimension of  minus the number of constraints. Then

and if  is chosen so that  the constraint equation will be always satisfied. Substituting into the quadratic form gives an unconstrained minimization problem:

the solution of which is given by:

Lagrangian duality

The Lagrangian dual of a QP is also a QP. We write the Lagrangian function as 

Hence the dual function is 

and so the Lagrangian dual of the QP is

Besides the Lagrangian duality theory, there are other duality pairings (e.g. Wolfe, etc.).

Complexity

For positive definite , the ellipsoid method solves the problem in (weakly) polynomial time.  If, on the other hand,  is indefinite, then the problem is NP-hard.  
There can be several stationary points and local minima for these non-convex problems. In fact, even if  has only one negative eigenvalue, the problem is (strongly) NP-hard.

Integer constraints 
There are some situations where one or more elements of the vector  will need to take on integer values. This leads to the formulation of a mixed-integer quadratic programming (MIQP) problem. Applications of MIQP include water resources and the construction of index funds.

Solvers and scripting (programming) languages

See also
Sequential quadratic programming
Linear programming
Critical line method

References

Further reading

 
  A6: MP2, pg.245.

External links
A page about QP
NEOS Optimization Guide: Quadratic Programming
Quadratic Programming

Optimization algorithms and methods